Piletas is a barrio in the municipality of Lares, Puerto Rico. Its population in 2010 was 5,671.

History
Puerto Rico was ceded by Spain in the aftermath of the Spanish–American War under the terms of the Treaty of Paris of 1898 and became an unincorporated territory of the United States. In 1899, the United States Department of War conducted a census of Puerto Rico finding that the population of Piletas barrio was 2,455.

Places
In 2017, as Puerto Rico and Lares continued to struggle economically, community leaders decided that unused public schools, including one in Piletas Arce (on Puerto Rico Highway 129), would be used by the agricultural industry of Lares. The school became a community center for local farmers.

La Piramide de Piletas Restaurant, located in Sector Las Lajas, was featured by the Puerto Rico Department of Tourism Discover Puerto Rico campaign.

Sectors
Barrios (which are roughly comparable to minor civil divisions) and subbarrios, in turn, are further subdivided into smaller local populated place areas/units called sectores (sectors in English). The types of sectores may vary, from normally sector to urbanización to reparto to barriada to residencial, among others.

The following sectors are in Piletas barrio:

, and  
.

Gallery

See also

 List of communities in Puerto Rico
 List of barrios and sectors of Lares, Puerto Rico

References

External links

Barrios of Lares, Puerto Rico